The 1990–91 Sussex County Football League season was the 66th in the history of Sussex County Football League a football competition in England.

Division One

Division One featured 16 clubs which competed in the division last season, along with two new clubs, promoted from Division Two:
Bexhill Town
Oakwood

League table

Division Two

Division Two featured twelve clubs which competed in the division last season, along with four new clubs.
Clubs relegated from Division One:
Lancing
Redhill
Clubs promoted from Division Three:
Sidley United
Worthing United

League table

Division Three

Division Three featured eleven clubs which competed in the division last season, along with two new clubs, relegated from Division Two:
Ferring
Storrington

League table

References

1990-91
1990–91 in English football leagues